Jonathan Luther Jackson (born January 7, 1966) is an American politician, businessman, and activist serving as the U.S. representative for  since 2023. He was previously the national spokesman for the Rainbow/PUSH Coalition and a partner in the Chicago-based beer distributorship River North Sales and Service.

Early life and education
Jackson was born in Chicago, to Jesse Jackson, a noted civil rights activist and Baptist minister, and Jacqueline Lavinia Jackson. His godfather was Martin Luther King Jr., from whom Jackson gets his middle name. Jackson has four siblings, Santita Jackson and former U.S. Representative Jesse Jackson Jr., his elders, and Yusef, Jacqueline Jackson, and Ashley, his younger siblings.

Jackson attended Whitney M. Young Magnet High School in Chicago, where he was a student-athlete. He attended his parents' alma mater, North Carolina A&T State University in Greensboro, North Carolina, to study business. He is a graduate of the Kellogg Graduate School of Business at Northwestern University in Evanston, Illinois.

Civil and human rights activism

Born into a family steeped in human rights activism, Jackson has traveled the world as an aide de camp to his father. He traveled to Syria in 1983, when his father negotiated with Syrian President Hafez al-Assad to release captured American pilot Robert Goodman. He met Fidel Castro in 1984, when his father negotiated the release of 22 Americans being held in Cuba. He was also with his father in August 2005, when he traveled to Venezuela to meet Venezuelan President Hugo Chávez. This followed controversial remarks by televangelist Pat Robertson implying that Chávez should be assassinated. Jackson condemned Robertson's remarks as immoral.

In 2007, Jonathan Jackson took on the issues of innocence and juvenile justice as national spokesman for the RainbowPUSH Coalition. He has highlighted the personal stories and continued trials of those who accused the Chicago Police Department of torturing them to obtain confessions that landed them in prison. They include Darrell Cannon, who faced the death penalty for a 1983 drug-related murder. Cannon was released after accepting a January 2001 deal to abandon his torture claim in exchange for being released, according to the Northwestern Center on Wrongful Convictions. Jackson has also showcased the travails of Oscar Walden, who in 1952 became Illinois's first exoneree. Walden was freed after being sentenced to 75 years for a rape he did not commit.

Jackson has championed the cause of Johnnie Lee Savory, a Peoria native convicted of stabbing to death his friends Connie Cooper and James Robinson in their Peoria home in 1977. After serving over 28 years in prison, Savory was released on parole on December 19, 2006. Jackson is among several notables who have petitioned the Illinois governor—first Rod Blagojevich, then Pat Quinn—to order DNA testing in Savory's case to prove not only that did Savory not kill his friends, but also to pinpoint the person widely suspected of committing the crime.

In 2008, Jackson turned his attention to closures of Chicago Public Schools. He has led several schools to public hearings and civic education training to thwart school closures and turnarounds by private companies in favor of investing in existing schools and keeping a community's institutional memory intact—especially in highly mobile neighborhoods where large numbers of students are homeless or living on the economic margins. In February 2010, he succeeded in helping Guggenheim Elementary School get off the closure list. Guggenheim is in the Englewood community on the city's South Side. Jackson, among others, made the case that forcing students to walk any further to school put them in harm's way. They also made the case that Guggenheim's test scores have steadily improved and it had a close-knit community with the momentum to achieve further gains. Previously, Jackson had persuaded school officials to abandon plans to close Holmes Elementary School, among others.

Jackson's view of outsourcing public education mirrors that of an emerging vocal group of educators like New York University's Diane Ravitch and activists who assert that over-reliance on test scores and privatizing of public schools through wholesale charters and outsourcing allows schools to cherry-pick their student bodies while siphoning resources from the most marginalized children. They consider programs like No Child Left Behind and charter schools as a divestment of public education.

Career

Jackson started his career in 1988 at Drexel Burnham Lambert as an investment analyst for Michael Milken, an American financier and philanthropist, noted for his role in developing a market for high-yield bonds known as junk bonds. Jackson later worked as an analyst at Independence Bank, was a Shatkin Arbor runner at the Chicago Board of Trade, and developed real estate for East Lake Management in Chicago. He rejoined Milken at Knowledge Universe in the late 1990s and engages in investments in the wireless, real estate and distribution sectors.

In 1998, Jackson, with his brother Yusef, became owner of a Chicago-based Anheuser-Busch Cos. distributorship – River North Sales and Service, LLC. The deal was met with charges of skepticism and nepotism because Jackson's father had previously organized a boycott of the brewery's products in the early 1980s. The elder Jackson wanted the brewery to do more business in the African-American community.

In 2009, Jackson lead a group of minority investors in a $250 million bid to take over ION Media Networks, the country's largest chain of independent TV stations. Partnered with Cyrus Capital Partners, a New York investment firm, Jackson argued that second-lien lenders are treated as second-class citizens.

He has taught finance and entrepreneurship at City Colleges of Chicago and is a business professor at Chicago State University.

On August 8, 2012, New York Post writer Tara Palmeri reported that an unnamed source close to the Jackson family claimed Jonathan Jackson was being primed to take his brother's place in Congress. In a follow-up to reports about Jesse Jackson Jr.'s treatment at the Mayo Clinic for depression and gastrointestinal disorders, the Post said Jesse Jackson Sr. was "laying the groundwork" for Jonathan to run in the November election if Jesse Jr. "is not up to running for reelection." The elder Jackson, according to the Post, has denied laying the table for Jonathan. In addition to teaching a full load at Chicago State, Jonathan is a businessman focused on building his Cricket Wireless franchise operation.

U.S. House of Representatives

Elections

2022 

In February 2022, Jackson announced his candidacy to represent Illinois's 1st congressional district after the incumbent, Bobby Rush, announced his retirement a month earlier. Campaigning as a progressive, he was endorsed by Bernie Sanders and other figures in the progressive wing of his party. He won a crowded Democratic primary with approximately 30% of the vote, and later easily the general election as expected in this heavily Democratic seat.

Caucus memberships 

 Congressional Progressive Caucus

Personal life
Jackson married Marilyn Ann Richards of Brooklyn in 1995. Their children include Jonathan T. Jackson, Leah Jackson, and Noah Jackson.

References

External links

Congressman Jonathan Jackson official U.S. House website
Jonathan Jackson for Congress campaign website 

|-

1966 births
African-American members of the United States House of Representatives
African-American people in Illinois politics
Businesspeople from Illinois
Democratic Party members of the United States House of Representatives from Illinois
Illinois Democrats
Jonathan
Living people
North Carolina A&T State University alumni